Karla Ysabel Marquez-Fariñas (born December 21, 1986; Manila, Philippines), professionally known as Karel Marquez-Fariñas, is a Filipina actress, model, singer, and TV host who's currently signed under manager, Becky Aguila since July 2017. Before she joined GMA Network, she was part of ABS-CBN's Talent Management & Development Center (known as Star Magic).  She was Star Magic's Batch 10 alumna. Today, she is a freelance artist and entrepreneur.

Career 
Marquez started as VJ in Myx, a subsidiary of ABS-CBN, in 2003. She was transferred to ABS-CBN's rival network, GMA Network, despite being a VJ in Myx until 2007. She starred in GMA's afternoon Philippine television drama Pati Ba Pintig Ng Puso?. She was also a mainstay in GMA's Sunday variety program SOP. She hosted a segment in GMA's gag show Bitoy's Funniest Videos, titled "Just 4 Kikays". She co-starred in GMA's primetime Zaido: Pulis Pangkalawakan, as Lyka. She was one-half of the cover girls in the November 2006 edition of FHM Philippines. Marquez, alongside Drew Arellano, was also a co-host in Coca-Cola: Ride To Fame, a reality talent show. She was also a radio DJ.

She starred in GMA's Philippine television drama My Husband's Lover.

Personal life 
Marquez's first relationship (ex-boyfriend) was with Arman de Guzman, with whom she had two children, Keiley and Kyler. Marquez began dating Sean Fariñas in January 2012. They became engaged on May 6, 2016, and got married on December 1, 2016.

Filmography

Television

Film
 Otso-Otso Pamela Mela Wan (2004)
 Close to You (2006)
 Tiyanaks (2007)

Awards and nominations

References

External links
 
 

1986 births
Living people
People from Manila
People from Olongapo
Actresses from Zambales
Singers from Zambales
Filipino female models
VJs (media personalities)
Filipino women pop singers
21st-century Filipino women singers
Participants in Philippine reality television series
Star Magic
ABS-CBN personalities
GMA Network personalities
TV5 (Philippine TV network) personalities